Streatley is a village and civil parish in the Central Bedfordshire district of Bedfordshire, England.

Geography
Nearby villages are Lower Sundon, further to the west, Sharpenhoe, 1.5 miles north, and Barton-le-Clay, a somewhat larger village about 1.5 miles north, on the eastern side of the A6.

The parish covers the village of Streatley along with Sharpenhoe. In the south of the parish it covers both sides of the A6, bordering Luton to the south and North Hertfordshire district of Hertfordshire to the east. North of the village of Streatley, the parish is entirely to the west of the A6. According to the 2001 census the parish had a population of 1,707.

The Icknield Way Path passes through the village on its 110-mile journey from Ivinghoe Beacon in Buckinghamshire to Knettishall Heath in Suffolk. The Icknield Way Trail, a multi-user route for walkers, horse riders and off-road cyclists also passes through the village.

History
The parish is of ancient origin, and has sometimes been known as 'Streatley with Sharpenhoe'. It was expanded in 1928 by taking part of the abolished Limbury parish, which was mostly being annexed to Luton, and then again in 1933 by taking in part of Stopsley parish which suffered a similar fate.

Public house
Streatley contains only one public house, The Chequers, which serves a variety of beers and ales for all customers who visit the village. Food and accommodation is also available.

St Margaret's Church

The village is the site of an Anglican church dedicated to St Margaret.

Vicars
Records of the St Margaret's ministers go back to 1250 starting with William de Stratle.

Reverend James Hadow (1757–1847)

James Hadow was born in St Andrews on 30 January 1757, the eldest son of Professor George Hadow, was vicar for fifty nine years, from 1781 to 1840.  He matriculated at St Andrews university in 1773 and was a Glasgow scholar of Balliol College, Oxford.  He married Sarah Wye (1762–1849) in 1788. The Wye family had for some generations lived in Porto, Portugal where her father John Wye (1737–1807) worked at the British Factory Chaplaincy. The Wye family had in the past owned Lypiatt Park, near Stroud, Gloucestershire.  It is said that James fell in love with Sarah Wye, but the Wye family did not approve and sent her off to her uncle at Beverley in Yorkshire. One night when the family were going out to a ball she pleaded ill health, and stayed at home, and James eloped with her. They went to St Andrews and were married there.

James Hadow is buried in the church grounds.  Hadow's gravestone reads:  "Here rest the remains of James Hadow, Clerk MA Late Vicar of Streatley and Sundon. He was born 30 Jan AD 1757 Was instituted to Streatley AD 1781 to Sundon AD 1786 Resigned AD 1840  And in hope of mercy through Christ Jesus the Saviour died on 30 Jan AD 1847  Blessed be the name of the Lord.

Sarah Wye is also buried beside him.  Her grave reads: "Sarah Wye his beloved and affectionate wife Who died 14 June 1849 Aged 86 years Blessed are the dead who die in the Lord".

James Hadow and Sarah Wye had eight children.

John Gibson

John Gibson was the brother of Guy Gibson leader of the Dambuster's raid.

References

External links

 St Margaret's Streatley official site

Villages in Bedfordshire
Civil parishes in Bedfordshire
Central Bedfordshire District